The 1972 Coppa Italia Final was the final of the 1971–72 Coppa Italia. The match was played on 5 July 1972 between Milan and Napoli. Milan won 2–0.

Match

References 
Coppa Italia 1971/72 statistics at rsssf.com
 https://www.calcio.com/calendario/ita-coppa-italia-1971-1972-finale/2/
 https://www.worldfootball.net/schedule/ita-coppa-italia-1971-1972-finale/2/

Coppa Italia Finals
Coppa Italia Final 1972
Coppa Italia Final 1972